Pasant Aahe Mulgi was an Indian Marathi language television program that aired on Zee Marathi from 25 January 2016 to 20 August 2016.

Synopsis
Pasant Ahe Mulgi is about the out-going Urmi and mischievous but sweet, Vasu. Pasant Ahe Mulgi will show us how a match made in heaven will face turmoil on earth when their families come face to face. Vasu’s father has strong religious beliefs, whereas Urmi’s family is a typical middle class family with contemporary thoughts. How will these two families with opposite thoughts come together? Will Vasu’s family like Urmi? Will the matching of minds be enough or will Vasu’s family ask for a girl with a perfect horoscope match for their son?

Special episode

1 hour 
 14 February 2016
 27 June 2016
 17 July 2016

2 hours 
 17 April 2021 (Urmi-Vasu's marriage)

Cast

Main 
 Resham Prashant as Urmi
 Abhishek Deshmukh as Punarvasu (Vasu)

Recurring 
 Girish Oak as Punarvasu's father (Pant)
 Sanjay Mone as Krishnakant Kulkarni
 Vijay Mishra as Urmi's father
 Meghana Vaidya as Mai, Pant's wife, Punarvasu's mother
 Padmanabh Bind as Ramakant, Punarvasu's elder brother
 Ketaki Saraf as Nandini, Punarvasu's stepsister
 Namrata Kadam as Kumud, Ramakant's wife
 Rama Joshi as Urmi's grandmother
 Siddhirupa Karmarkar as Urmi's mother

Reception 
The series was broadcast from Monday to Saturday at 8 pm by replacing the popular show Honar Sun Me Hya Gharchi. This show always maintained its position in top 5 Marathi TV shows.

Ratings

References

External links 
 
 Pasant Aahe Mulgi at ZEE5

Marathi-language television shows
Zee Marathi original programming
2016 Indian television series debuts
2016 Indian television series endings